The Koman languages are a small close-knit family of languages located along the Ethiopia–Sudan border with about 50,000 speakers. They are conventionally classified as part of the Nilo-Saharan family. However, due to the paucity of evidence, many scholars treat it as an independent language family. Among scholars who do accept its inclusion within Nilo-Saharan, opinions vary as to their position within it.

Koman languages in Ethiopia are in close contact with the Omotic Mao languages. In Ethiopia, some Koman-speaking groups also consider themselves to be ethnically Mao.

Internal classification
The Koman languages are:
Koman
 Uduk, or T’wampa, (formerly in South Sudan)—about 20,000 speakers, most at a large refugee camp at Bonga, near Gambela
 Kwama (Ethiopia)—about 15,000 speakers, mainly in Benishangul-Gumuz
 Komo (Sudan)—about 12,000 speakers mainly in An Nil al Azraq
 Opuuo (Opo), or Shita (Ethiopia)—spoken in 5 villages north of the Nuer by about 5,000 people
 Dana, a newly discovered language located near Opo
 ?Gule (Sudan)—extinct

The poorly known Shabo language (600 speakers) shows strong Koman influence, and it has been suggested (on little evidence) that it may be a Koman language. Gule is generally classified as Koman, but the evidence is as yet insufficient.

Otero (2019)
Otero's (2019: 28) internal classification of Koman:

Koman
Gwama
Highland Gwama
Lowland Gwama
Central
Komo–Uduk
Komo
Uduk
Chali
Yabus
Dana–Opo
Dana
Opo
Bilugu, Modin
Pame, Kigile

External classification
Dimmendaal (2008) notes that mounting grammatical evidence has made the Nilo-Saharan proposal as a whole more sound since Greenberg proposed it in 1963 but that such evidence has not been forthcoming for Songhay, Gumuz, and Koman: "very few of the more widespread nominal and verbal morphological markers of Nilo-Saharan are attested in the Coman languages plus Gumuz ... Their genetic status remains debatable, mainly due to lack of more extensive data." (2008:843) And later, "In summarizing the current state of knowledge, ... the following language families or phyla can be identified: ... Mande, Songhai, Ubangian, Kadu, and the Coman languages plus Gumuz." (2008:844) However, Ahland (2010) reports that with better attestation, both Koman and Gumuz do appear to be Nilo-Saharan, and perhaps closest to each other.

Reconstruction
Proto-Koman has been reconstructed by Lionel Bender (1983) and Otero (2019).

Numerals
Comparison of numerals in individual languages:

See also
List of Proto-Koman reconstructions (Wiktionary)

References

 Colleen Ahland, 2010. "The Classification of Gumuz and Koman Languages" presented at the Language Isolates in Africa workshop, Lyons, December 4, 2010
 Lionel Bender, 2000. "Nilo-Saharan". In Bernd Heine and Derek Nurse, eds., African Languages: An Introduction. Cambridge University Press.
 Gerrit Dimmendaal, 2008. "Language Ecology and Linguistic Diversity on the African Continent", Language and Linguistics Compass 2/5:842.

 
Language families
Komuz languages